The New Jersey State Police (NJSP) is the official state police force of the U.S. state of New Jersey. It is a general-powers police agency with statewide jurisdiction, designated by troop sectors.

History
As with other state police organizations, the primary reason for the creation of the New Jersey State Police was for the protection of rural areas that had never had law enforcement, beyond a local sheriff,  who was often not able to provide suitable police services.  Legislation for its creation was first introduced in 1914, but it would not be until March 29, 1921, with the passing of the State Police Bill, that a statewide police force was created. Senator Clarence I. Case was the driving force behind the 1921 legislation, however, the person with the most impact on the organization was its first Superintendent Norman Schwarzkopf, Sr. Schwarzkopf was a graduate of West Point and this training and his time in the military heavily influenced how he organized and trained his first group of troopers. The first State Police class reported for training on September 1, 1921 and consisted of 116 men out of an applicant group of 600. Training took place in Sea Girt, New Jersey on the same grounds as the current State Police Academy. Out of the 116 men who started training only 81 officers and troopers completed the three-month training program. According to the New Jersey State Police website:

Core functions

The New Jersey State Police is responsible for general police services, general highway and traffic enforcement, statewide investigation and intelligence services, emergency management, support for state and local law enforcement efforts, maintenance of criminal records and identification systems and regulation of certain commerce such as firearms ownership.

Many municipalities in southern and north-western New Jersey lack local police departments, therefore the state police have the primary responsibility for providing police services to these towns for a yearly assessed nominal fee paid to the state government.

The New Jersey State Police is also charged with the responsibility of protecting the Governor of New Jersey and Lieutenant Governor of New Jersey, as well as the President of the New Jersey Senate and the Speaker of the New Jersey General Assembly.

Motto and badge
"Honor, Duty, Fidelity", the motto of the New Jersey State Police was adapted from the West Point motto "Duty, Honor, Country". The triangular state police logo and hat badge represents this motto. The badge has stars in each of its three corners and was created by New York jeweler Julius George Schwarzkopf, the father of founder Herbert Norman Schwarzkopf. The NJSP logo includes the year 1921, date of founding, in place of a badge number.

Academy
Training for recruits takes place at the State Police Academy located in Sea Girt, New Jersey. The academy is both physically and mentally demanding on the recruit. The recruits live at the academy during the week and are responsible for the upkeep of the barracks and academy grounds, as well as their equipment and uniforms. The curriculum consists of ten units of study that increase in difficulty and complexity over the 24 weeks of training.  Drop out rate for new recruits in the academy is above or close to 35% per class.  Some areas/units of study include:

 Curriculum: The New Jersey State Police Academy utilizes an adult-based learning methodology where the recruits are expected to be active participants in the learning process. Each recruit is provided a laptop computer with wireless Internet access which is used for researching the numerous assignments and topics covered in the curriculum. The academy has a full-time librarian on staff to assist recruits with research. The curriculum consists of ten units of instruction. Each unit focuses on a comprehensive aspect of law enforcement work that builds upon one another, beginning with simple tasks and culminating with complex issues. Each recruit is required to pass both a written and practical examination at the end of each unit. The written examinations require a minimum passing score of 70%. The practical examinations are hands-on scenarios that require recruits to demonstrate proficiency in the subject matter and skills covered in the unit. The curriculum relies heavily on scenario based training and research assignments. Recruits are provided with approximately a two-hour study hall period every evening that is used to prepare for class, complete assignments, and study for examinations.
 Physical training: Three two-hour sessions per week. Muscular conditioning is also stressed and recruits must pass all physical tests.
 Self-defense: Consists of approximately 20 hours of active counter measures, 28 hours of defensive tactics, and 18 hours of expandable straight baton instruction.
 Firearms: Recruits must show proper usage and care of all firearms issued by the state police, including the Glock 19 Gen 4 9mm handgun and Benelli M1 shotgun. Recruits go through 60 hours of firearms training.
 Water safety: Consists of 40 hours of water safety and life saving instruction.
 Driving: Driving consists of approximately 21 hours of instruction and each recruit is required to show proficiency in the operation of police vehicle.

Equipment
 Glock 19 Gen 4
 Benelli M1 shotgun

The New Jersey State Police adopted the Glock 19 Gen 4 9mm handgun as their new service pistol after the agency sued SIG Sauer for manufacturing defective handguns. The New Jersey State Police were using the SIG Sauer P229 before they transitioned to the Glock 19 Gen 4. The New Jersey State Police also use the Benelli M1 shotgun.

Rank structure

Uniform

In addition to its distinctive triangular badge, Troopers wear a distinctive uniform for regular patrol duties, which is normally reserved for "Class A" functions in nearby state police forces (Delaware, New York, and Pennsylvania). The uniform originated from Schwarzkopf's time in the U.S. Army Cavalry. The winter uniform consists of a French blue Army-style coat, known as a blouse, with brass buttons, and gold triangular patches, with "N.J." on the right lapel and "S.P." on the left. The blouse is worn over a dress shirt, light blue for sergeants and below, white for lieutenants and above, and a navy blue necktie. Navy blue trousers or riding breeches bearing a gold stripe on each side completes the uniform. During the summer, the blouse is replaced with a long-sleeve blue shirt, while a necktie is still worn. A saucer-shaped hat (as opposed to a Stetson hat in New York and Maryland or the Campaign hat in Delaware and Pennsylvania) is worn, with two straps—one going over the crown, giving the uniform a distinctive, imposing appearance. The NJSP is one of only five state police forces that do not wear a badge on their uniform shirts; the Troopers' badge is only worn on their hat. For this reason, it is unusual to see a Trooper without his/her cover on. Enlisted Troopers wear their applicable rank on the sleeves while officers wear their rank on shoulder epaulets. Additionally, both winter and summer uniforms are worn with the full Sam Browne belt, if a belt-mounted sidearm is worn, unusual for a North American police agency’s patrol uniform due to cited safety concerns. The full Sam Browne belt was adopted by Col. Schwarzkopf, as the belt gave the wearer a proper "brace" (known by General of the Armies John Pershing as the "West Point Brace;" appropriate at the time since Pershing and Schwarzkopf were both graduates).

Current organization

The current organization of the New Jersey State Police is:
Superintendent of the State Police, Patrick J Callahan
 Administration Branch, which consists of the Administration Section, Information Technology Section, and the Division Human Resources Section
 Homeland Security Branch, which consists of the Emergency Management Section and the Special Operations Section.
 The Investigations Branch which consists of the Intelligence Section and the Special Investigations Section
 The Operations Branch, which consists of Field Operations Sections which are further divided into the following four troops:
 Troop A: Southern New Jersey (including the Atlantic City Expressway)
 Troop B: Northern New Jersey
 Troop C: Central New Jersey
 Troop D: New Jersey Turnpike, Garden State Parkway

This department is a member of the New York-New Jersey Regional Fugitive Task Force.

Traffic management

NJSP is one third of the participants of a traffic management center called STMC (Statewide Traffic Management Center) located in Woodbridge, NJ.

STMC is also the home to New Jersey Department of Transportation and the New Jersey Turnpike Authority.  The STMC is staffed 24/7 and is responsible for the coordination and logistics of statewide resources during major incidents within the State of New Jersey.

Demographics 
As of 2007, the demographics of the New Jersey State Police was as follows:
Male: 97%
Female: 3%
White: 85%
African-American/Black: 8%
Hispanic: 5%
Asian: 1%
Native American: 1%

Law enforcement accreditation 
The New Jersey State Police, as of July 2007, received a coveted law enforcement accreditation after more than a year of intense reviews and grading. The Commission on Accreditation for Law Enforcement Agencies (CALEA) bestowed the honor at a meeting of their commissioners in Montreal, Quebec.

The award is the culmination of a two-year process that included on-site inspections from a national team representing the commission. Assessors examined files, conducted panel interviews of staff members, inspected facilities, and performed ride-a-longs with troopers.

Accreditation brings several significant benefits. Primarily, it improves public safety services by comparing the New Jersey State Police to the best procedures currently used by law enforcement and raising any non-compliant areas up to those standards. Additionally, it creates accountability to a respected benchmarking group that knows the work of modern policing. Public trust is bolstered by way of the transparency involved in the whole CALEA accreditation process.

In popular culture
The novel Expressway (1973) by Elleston Trevor, writing under the pseudonym "Howard North," is set during a busy 4th of July weekend, and depicts a group of New Jersey State Troopers trying to keep a lid on crime and traffic problems during that period.  It was adapted into a TV movie titled Smash-Up on Interstate 5, changing the setting from a New Jersey turnpike to a California freeway, and changing the police from New Jersey State Troopers to officers of the California Highway Patrol.

Bruce Springsteen's album Nebraska (1982) contains the dark song "State Trooper" in which a traveller on the New Jersey Turnpike,
a desperate man who has committed unknown crimes, hopes that he won't be pulled over by a State Trooper. This song was used in The Sopranos.

New Jersey Turnpike ridin' on a wet night 'neath the refinery's glow, out where the great black rivers flow
License, registration, I ain't got none but I got a clear conscience 'Bout the things I done
Mister state trooper, please don't stop me
Please don't stop me, please don't stop me!

In the 2009 film Paul Blart: Mall Cop, Kevin James plays a mall security guard who dreams of becoming a New Jersey State Trooper. In the beginning of the film, he is taking the entry course in the police academy and several training instructors are seen as well as some officers in dress uniforms in the background.

Controversy

Meal allowances
Until 1949, the state police provided a meal to patrol officers at the nearest station which was replaced with a meal allowance so they did not need to leave the area where they were patrolling.  The IRS challenged a tax return arguing that, unlike the actual meal, the meal allowance was taxable.  In Commissioner v. Kowalski, the US Supreme Court ruled in favor of the IRS that the income was now taxable.

Racial profiling

In the late 1990s, both the Maryland and New Jersey State Police agencies were subject to allegations of racial profiling which claimed that black motorists were being pulled over disproportionately on the New Jersey Turnpike and on Interstate 95. A nationwide controversy erupted, which ultimately resulted in a federal monitor watching over the New Jersey State Police. In a consent decree, the New Jersey State Police agreed to adopt a new policy that no individual may be detained based on race, unless said individual matches the description of a specific suspect. The consent decree was dissolved on September 21, 2009.

New Jersey Turnpike shooting
On April 23, 1998, Troopers James Kenna and John Hogan opened fire on a van they stopped for speeding on the New Jersey Turnpike. The four passengers in the van were unarmed. The troopers said they fired, wounding three of the four minority men inside, when the van lurched back toward them. This also started the investigation of possible racial profiling within law enforcement in New Jersey.

Lords of Discipline
On December 1, 2003, Trooper Justin Hopson filed a lawsuit in U.S. District Court in Camden. Hopson alleged in his complaint that he was hazed and harassed by a group of fellow state troopers known as the "Lords of Discipline." The hazing occurred when Hopson with only eleven days on the force at the time, refused to falsify the facts underlying an illegal arrest of a citizen. The complaint alleges that after Hopson refused to support the arrest, he was physically assaulted, received threatening notes, and his car was vandalized while on duty. Over the years, several troopers have come forward about the Lords of Discipline. The secret group allegedly drove nails into colleagues' tires, damaged lockers, and wore Lords of Discipline inscribed T-shirts. The NJ Attorney General's Office conducted a two-year investigation into the group where seven troopers were suspended or reprimanded but the probe found "no organized group of troopers known as the Lords of Discipline." On October 1, 2007, the State of New Jersey agreed to a $400,000 settlement with Justin Hopson. A spokesman for the attorney general called the Hopson settlement "fair and reasonable."

Arrest of Officer Gary S. Wade
On August 17, 2004 New Jersey State Police troopers Michael Colaner and David Ryan pulled over detective Gary S. Wade of the Tinton Falls Police Department for allegedly speeding.

The detective, Gary S. Wade, who worked for the Police Department in Tinton Falls for eight years, was supposedly on his way to work and driving with his seatbelt on in an unmarked police car with a spotlight on the driver's side, wearing a shirt with an embroidered badge on it and also wearing a badge on his belt. After being pulled over Wade called his supervisor according to his department's protocol and asked the State Troopers to wait until his supervisor arrived.

However, the dash camera from trooper Colaner's patrol vehicle indicated that within 30 seconds Colaner had pulled a gun on Wade who was still in his car. According to a transcript of the video Wade had asked twice why he was being pulled over and received no answer from the Troopers. Colaner then informed Wade that he was placing Wade under arrest for disorderly conduct and after a 90-second exchange the troopers pulled Wade out of his car. The video then shows Colaner hitting Wade in the back of the head with a fist wrapped around a can of pepper spray just before Wade was forced to the ground. Wade was then doused with pepper spray and handcuffed.

Wade was subsequently charged and convicted in 2006 in municipal court, of the disorderly persons (misdemeanor) offense: Obstruction of Administration of Law, and the traffic infraction of careless driving.  He was convicted again in Superior Court and was ordered to forfeit his position with the Borough of Tinton Falls Police Department.  His appeal of the conviction and forfeiture was denied in 2008.

However, in 2010, a federal jury in a civil lawsuit found that Trooper Colaner used excessive force in the handling of Wade and awarded Wade $5 million in compensatory and punitive damages.

Trooper Robert Higbee
On September 27, 2006, Trooper Robert Higbee was attempting to stop a speeding car, driven by Joshua Wigglesworth, when he failed to yield at a stop sign at the intersection of Stagecoach and Tuckahoe Roads in Marmora, an unincorporated part of Upper Township, Cape May County. He then collided with a minivan occupied by two sisters, 17-year-old Jacqueline and 19-year-old Christina Becker, which then collided with another vehicle occupied by Robert Taylor and his son Michael. Jacqueline and Christina Becker were pronounced dead at the scene. Higbee was suspended without pay after being indicted and tried on two counts of vehicular homicide in the deaths of Jacqueline and Christina Becker. Higbee was subsequently acquitted on all counts. The mother of Jacqueline and Christina Becker has settled a civil lawsuit for $2 million, while Taylor has filed a lawsuit against Higbee and the New Jersey State Police.
 These events, including the criminal trial, have been depicted in Closing the Gap, an account by Higbee's defense attorney D. William Subin.

Chris Christie helicopter to baseball game
On May 31, 2011, New Jersey State Police helicoptered Governor Chris Christie and his wife, Mary Pat, to their son's high school baseball game in Montvale, NJ, Bergen County.  At the baseball game, another NJSP vehicle, a black car with tinted windows, drove Christie and his wife to and from the helicopter to the baseball field—approximately 200 yards. NJSP then helicoptered Christie to Princeton to meet with Republican business leaders from Iowa who were trying to draft him to run for president. The AgustaWestland helicopter cost tax-payers $12.5 million and was operated by NJSP personnel. 
Christie and Colonel Joseph Rick Fuentes defended the use of NJSP department resources, though New Jersey residents complained about the misuse of government and police resources for personal entertainment. Assemblyman Paul Moriart called on the governor to disclose the use of NJSP helicopters and reimburse taxpayers for the costs associated with personal and political trips. "Gov. Christie must learn that tax payers cannot afford his helicopter joyrides", said Moriart.

Arrest of Rebecca Musarra
On October 16, 2015, New Jersey State Troopers Matthew Stazzone and Demetric Gosa arrested Philadelphia-based attorney Rebecca Musarra. The arrest was captured on dashcam video from Stazzone's patrol vehicle. The video showed that when Stazzone asked Musarra the reason he has stopped her, Musarra asserted that she did not have to answer questions. Trooper Stazzone then arrested her for "obstruction" for failing to answer the question. Stazzone read Musarra her Miranda rights, including a statement about her right to remain silent and not answer questions. According to a lawsuit filed by Musarra in federal court, Stazzone and Gosa then took her to the State Police barracks in Washington, NJ. Once there, a supervisor viewed the tape of the arrest and informed Musarra that her arrest had been a mistake. In March 2017, the New Jersey State Police sent Musarra a letter stating that her allegations of false arrest and illegal search had been substantiated. Later that year, in August 2017, Musarra settled her federal lawsuit related to the incident for $30,000. Stazzone and Gosa remained on-duty after the incident and were reportedly given additional training.

Trooper Trump

In 2017, the State Police awarded President Donald Trump an honorary state trooper, giving him the badge number 45 (that had been assigned to Trooper Leo A. Griffin of the First Class in 1921, who did not graduate), in a private ceremony at the White House. Officials presenting the award included Patrick Callahan, Rick Fuentes and Jeffrey Mottley.

See also

 List of law enforcement agencies in New Jersey
State Police (United States)
State Patrol
Highway Patrol

References

External links
New Jersey State Police website
Road Stations and Troops

State agencies of New Jersey
State law enforcement agencies of New Jersey
Government agencies established in 1921
1921 establishments in New Jersey